Fokker was a Dutch aircraft manufacturer founded in 1912 by Dutch aviation pioneer Anthony Fokker.

Fokker may also refer to:

Fokker Rocks in Antarctica, named so because a Fokker airplane was damaged and abandoned there in 1928
Fokker Technologies, Dutch aerospace company founded in 2011; named for Anthony Fokker
VFW-Fokker, company involved in rocket and spacelab development; named for Anthony Fokker

People with the surname
Adriaan Fokker (1887–1972), Dutch physicist and musician
Anthony Fokker (1890–1939), Dutch aviation pioneer and an aircraft manufacturer
Hans Fokker (1900–1943), Dutch Olympic sailor
Herman Fokker (1921–2001), Dutch engineer and politician
Jan Piet Fokker (1942–2010), Dutch Olympic field hockey player

See also

 
 Focker (disambiguation)

Dutch-language surnames
Occupational surnames
Patronymic surnames